Eddie Jackson (born January 29, 1961), also known as EdBass and One Take, is an American bass guitarist for the progressive metal band Queensrÿche, which he co-founded in 1982.

Career
Jackson was born in Robstown, Texas. He began playing the acoustic guitar at age 14. Two years later, he switched to electric guitar and bass guitar. He also experimented with singing and drums. Jackson met drummer Scott Rockenfield in late 1979 at Redmond High School, and joined Rockenfield's band Cross+Fire in 1980. The band's name later was changed to The Mob, and in 1982 to Queensrÿche. Jackson has been with the band since, and is notoriously known for putting pranks on the inside of album covers, especially in the liner notes.

Endorsements and equipment
Jackson endorsed Kramer basses during the mid-1980s, until Kramer bought out Spector. The NS-2s were his primary bass guitars throughout the late 1980s and into the 1990s, and were among others used on Operation: Livecrime, until his black Spector was stolen in the mid-'90s, after which Jackson retired his white model from touring, and switched to using Spector's Euro 5LX and ReBop bass guitars. Jackson briefly endorsed Fernandes basses from 1994 to 1996, during Queensrÿche's Promised Land tour, before endorsing Bellevue-based master luthier Michael Lull, who had done all of the repair and upkeep work on Queensrÿche's guitars. He also used a rackmount Line 6 Bass Pod Pro at some point as well in the late 90's and early 2000's.

Jackson specifically uses the following bass guitars and amplifiers:

Bass guitars
 Spector "Kramer-era" (late 1980s) NS-2 in black (stolen in the mid-'90s).
 Spector "Kramer-era" (late 1980s) NS-2 in white.
 Spector Euro 5LX 5-string neck-through, with custom gloss white finish, black hardware and active EMG pickups and preamp.
 Spector ReBop 5 DLX FM (Deluxe Figured Maple) 5-string bolt-on, in Black Cherryburst with active EMG pickups and preamp.
 Mike Lull M4V "Modern/Vintage" 4-string in sunburst, with custom Seymour Duncan Bassline Jazz Bass-style pickups, Bartolini preamp and Hipshot Bass Xtender.
 Mike Lull M4V "Modern/Vintage" 4-string in black with active EMG Jazz Bass-style pickups, preamp and Hipshot Bass Xtender.
 Mike Lull M5V "Modern/Vintage" custom 5-string in black, rear-routed with no pickguard, custom Seymour Duncan Bassline Jazz Bass-style pickups and Bartolini preamp.
 Mike Lull M5V "Modern/Vintage" 5-string in sunburst with custom Seymour Duncan Bassline Jazz Bass-style pickups and Bartolini preamp.
 Mid-'90s Tobias 5-string in black
 Mid-'90s Tobias 5-string with an Operation: Mindcrime graphic on the front, with Bartolini pickups and preamp.
 Ibanez 4-string acoustic bass in black.

Bass amplifiers
 Hartke LH1000 bass amplifier.
 Hartke HX410 4x10" and Hartke HX115 1x15" HyDrive series bass cabinets.

Discography

Queensrÿche

Soundtrack appearances

References

1961 births
Living people
Queensrÿche members
American heavy metal bass guitarists
American male bass guitarists
Progressive metal bass guitarists
Guitarists from Texas
American male guitarists
20th-century American guitarists
People from Robstown, Texas
Glam metal musicians

pl:Eddie Jackson